Duke Ai may refer to:

Duke Ai of Qi ( 9th century BC), ruler of Qi during Western Zhou
Duke Ai of Song (died 800 BC), ruler of Song during Western Zhou
Duke Ai of Qin (died 501 BC), ruler of Qin during the Spring and Autumn period